Košíky is a municipality and village in Uherské Hradiště District in the Zlín Region of the Czech Republic. It has about 400 inhabitants.

Twin towns – sister cities

Košíky is twinned with:
 Nová Bošáca, Slovakia

References

Villages in Uherské Hradiště District